The 1970 USA Outdoor Track and Field Championships men's competition took place between June 26-28 at Memorial Stadium on the campus of Bakersfield College in Bakersfield, California. The women's division held their championships separately a little over a hundred miles south at Drake Stadium on the campus of University of California, Los Angeles in Westwood, California.

Results

Men track events

Men field events

Women track events

Women field events

See also
United States Olympic Trials (track and field)

References

 Results from T&FN
 results

USA Outdoor Track and Field Championships
Usa Outdoor Track And Field Championships, 1970
Track and field
Track and field in California
Outdoor Track and Field Championships
Outdoor Track and Field Championships
Sports competitions in California